Hoogendijk is a Dutch toponymic surname meaning "high dike". Among variant forms are Hogendijk and Hoogerdijk. Abroad the "ij" digraph is usually replaced with a "y." Notable people with the surname include:

Anouk Hoogendijk (born 1985), Dutch footballer
Cornelis Hoogendijk (1866–1911), Dutch art collector
Ferry Hoogendijk (1933–2014), Dutch journalist and politician
Jack Hoogendyk (born 1955), American (Michigan) Republican politician
Jan Hogendijk (born 1955), Dutch mathematician and historian of science
Jan Hoogendyk (born 1979), South African musician and songwriter known as "Elvis Blue"
Leen Hoogendijk (1890–1969), Dutch water polo player
Maria Ida Adriana Hoogendijk (1874-1942), Dutch painter
Micky Hoogendijk (born 1970), Dutch actress, presenter, model and photographer
Oeke Hoogendijk (born 1961), Dutch documentary film maker
Steven Hoogendijk (1698–1788), Dutch watchmaker and physicist

References

Dutch-language surnames
Dutch toponymic surnames